Tim Anderson may refer to:

 Tim Anderson (athlete) (born 1925), British former pole vaulter
 Tim Anderson (defensive back) (born 1949), American football defensive back
 Tim Anderson (RAF officer) (born 1957), Royal Air Force officer
 Tim Anderson (musician) (born 1977), American musician, songwriter and music producer
 Tim Anderson (cricketer) (born 1978), New Zealand cricketer
 Tim Anderson (defensive tackle) (born 1980), American football defensive tackle
 Tim Anderson (baseball) (born 1993), American baseball shortstop
 Tim Anderson (political economist) (born 1953), Australian academic and author
 Tim Anderson (politician), Virginia state legislator
 Tim Anderson (programmer), game programmer
 Tim Anderson (chef), British cook
 Tim Anderson (handballer), handballer for Australia men's national handball team